Tillari (Main) Dam is a gravity dam on Tillari river near Chandgad, Kolhapur district in the state of Maharashtra in India.

Specifications

Purpose
 Hydroelectricity power generation

See also
 Dams in Maharashtra
 List of reservoirs and dams in India

References

External links
 Goa wants water from Maharashtra's Tillari dam. 
 Maharashtra govt releases Tillari water to Goa.  

Dams in Kolhapur district
Dams completed in 1986
1986 establishments in Maharashtra